Brahmaea certhia, the Sino-Korean owl moth,  is a moth from the family Brahmaeidae, the Brahmin moths. It is found in the Korean Peninsula and China.

The larvae feed on privet, Fraxinus mandshurica and Syringa amurensis.

References

Brahmaeidae
Moths described in 1793
Moths of Asia